This is a list of English football transfers for the 2011 summer transfer window. Only moves featuring at least one Premier League or Championship club are listed.

The summer transfer window began once clubs had concluded their final domestic fixture of the 2010–11 season (only for teams in the same association e.g. FA or SFA), but many transfers only officially went through on 1 July because the majority of player contracts finish on 30 June. The window remained open until 23:00 BST on 31 August 2011. Transfers between English and foreign clubs could only be made from 9 June 2011 onward.

Transfers

All players and clubs without a flag are English.

See also
 List of Dutch football transfers summer 2011
 List of French football transfers summer 2011
 List of German football transfers summer 2011
 List of Italian football transfers summer 2011
 List of Spanish football transfers summer 2011

Notes and references
General

Specific

Transfers Summer 2011
Summer 2011
Football transfers summer 2011